Fire Pattern is a novel by Bob Shaw published in 1984.

Plot summary
Fire Pattern is a novel in which a reporter investigates people that spontaneously burst into flame.

Reception
Dave Langford reviewed Fire Pattern for White Dwarf #58, and stated that "A good read but – in its implications and its appearance from witty Bob Shaw – a slightly depressing one."

Reviews
Review by Chris Morgan (1984) in Fantasy Review, October 1984
Review by David Barrett (1984) in Vector 122
Review by Don D'Ammassa (1986) in Science Fiction Chronicle, #87 December 1986

References

1984 British novels